This is a list of listed buildings in the parish of Aberchirder in Aberdeenshire, Scotland.

List 

|}

Key

See also 
 List of listed buildings in Aberdeenshire
 Scheduled monuments in Aberdeenshire

Notes

References

 All entries, addresses and coordinates are based on data from Historic Scotland. This data falls under the Open Government Licence

Aberchirder